Lophoceps abdominalis is a moth of the family Sesiidae. It is known from Kenya.

References

Endemic moths of Kenya
Sesiidae
Moths of Africa
Moths described in 1919